Barakatabad (also Romanized as Barakatābād) is a village in Gudarzi Rural District, Oshtorinan District, Borujerd County, Lorestan Province, Iran. At the 2006 census, its population was 817, in 203 families.

References 

Towns and villages in Borujerd County